is a light novel series by Yoshiyuki Tomino published from 1983 to 1986, and a six-episode ONA, broadcast by Bandai Channel online beginning on December 12, 2005, with the final episode starting on August 18, 2006. It is an alternate story to another series, Aura Battler Dunbine, and is set in modern Japan and Byston Well in a timeline of its own. The characters were designed by Masashi Kudo.

Plot
Because his friends fired a rocket into the US Army camp, Suzuki was wanted by the US Army and the police. While he was running away the sea surface suddenly rose, and when a brilliant light appeared he saw a strange-looking battleship flying in the air. He was dumped into the sea and when he crawled onto the battleship there was a beautiful girl standing there. She said her name was Luxe, the princess of another world, and added "My father is Japanese, Shinjirou Sakomizu. Please help me, Suzuki".

Characters

2006 anime
 Asap is the protagonist of the series, named after the acronym ASAP. Asap eventually finds his way to pilot the Aura Battler, Nanajin. He is also a Holy Warrior.

 Luxe is the daughter of King Sakomizu in Byston Well, who took the Wings of Rean to the surface world.

A former World War II Imperial Japanese Ohka pilot, he is the ruler of the Hōjō house in Byston Well. His personal Aura Battler is the Oukaou. He is the Holy Warrior who was given the shoes of Wings of Rean.

A Mi Ferario from Warra Carren realm of Byston Well.

A friend of Asap's, he fired a rocket at an American army camp with his friend Kanamoto.　He becomes a Holy Warrior after becoming the pilot of new Aura Battler model Shinden.

A friend of Asap and Rouri's, he helped Rouri shoot at the American army camp with a bazooka. He becomes a Holy Warrior like Rouri after becoming the pilot of a new Aura Battler model Shinden.

 Leader of the rebel army who fights against Sakomizu's tyranny.

 Amalgam's subordinate in rebel army.

 Amalgam's subordinate in the rebel army.

List of episodes

Media

Theme songs
"MY FATE" (ending theme)
Performance: Anna Tsuchiya
Lyrics: ANNA
Composer/Arranger: Ayumi Miyazaki

References

Further reading
 Fujitsu, Ryota et al. (May 2007). "The Wings of Rean". Newtype USA. pp. 52–53.

External links
 The Wings of Rean official site
 

1983 Japanese novels
2005 anime ONAs
Bandai Entertainment anime titles
Isekai anime and manga
Isekai novels and light novels
Kadokawa Dwango franchises
Light novels
Sunrise (company)